Claudio Guerra (born September 5, 1983 in Santa Fe, Argentina) is an Argentine footballer currently playing for Unión Santa Fe of the Primera B Nacional in Argentina.

Teams
  Huracán 2002–2005
  Defensores de Belgrano 2005–2006
  Huracán 2006–2008
  Unión de Santa Fe 2008–2010
  Universidad Católica (Quito) 2010
  Huracán 2011
  Universidad de Concepción 2011–2012
  Aldosivi 2012–2013
  Defensa y Justicia 2013–2014
  Unión Santa Fe 2014–

References
 Profile at BDFA 

1983 births
Living people
Argentine footballers
Argentine expatriate footballers
Club Atlético Huracán footballers
Unión de Santa Fe footballers
C.D. Universidad Católica del Ecuador footballers
Universidad de Concepción footballers
Aldosivi footballers
Defensa y Justicia footballers
Primera Nacional players
Chilean Primera División players
Expatriate footballers in Chile
Expatriate footballers in Ecuador

Association footballers not categorized by position
Footballers from Santa Fe, Argentina